Corvo is a settlement in the northeastern part of the island of Fogo, Cape Verde. It is situated near the coast, 5 km southeast of Mosteiros.

See also
List of villages and settlements in Cape Verde

References

Villages and settlements in Fogo, Cape Verde
Mosteiros, Cape Verde